Sadao Wakizaka (1916 – 19 April 1945) was a Japanese field hockey player. He competed in the men's tournament at the 1936 Summer Olympics. He died during World War II.

References

External links
 

1916 births
1945 deaths
Japanese male field hockey players
Olympic field hockey players of Japan
Field hockey players at the 1936 Summer Olympics
Place of birth missing
Japanese military personnel killed in World War II
Japanese military personnel of World War II
20th-century Japanese people